Eric Baumann (born 1962) is a German musicologist.  He is an authority on the work of Karl May.  He is better known popularly for his humorous book Der Komponist Ferdinand Loh (The Composer Ferdinand Loh), which is about the anonymous children's piece Der Flohwalzer.

Works
 Kleine Frühlingsmusik: für Flöte u. Klavier, Bärenreiter-Verl., 1988
 Der Komponist Ferdinand Loh und sein opus magnum, Der Flohwalzer, Atlantis, 1996, 
 Ein Ave Maria im Wilden Westen: Karl May als Komponist, Atlantis Musikbuch-Verlag, 2002, 
 Wie kam die Glace auf das Stängeli?: 150 Fragen aus der weiten Welt der Wirtschaft, Eric Baumann, Stefan Eiselin Cosmos-Verl., 2009,

References

German musicologists
1962 births
Living people